Vyacheslav Andreyevich Zaytsev (born August 28, 1989) is a Russian professional basketball player for BC UNICS of the VTB United League, and of the EuroLeague until it was suspended due to the 2022 Russian invasion of Ukraine.

Professional career
In July 2016, Zaytsev signed a one-year contract with an option for a second year, with Khimki Moscow Region, returning to his former club after five years. On June 30, 2017, Zaytsev re-signed with Khimki, for another two years.

International career
Zaytsev played for the Russian junior national Under-18 and Under-20 teams.

References

External links
 Vyacheslav Zaytsev at eurobasket.com
 Vyacheslav Zaytsev at euroleague.net

Living people
1989 births
BC Enisey players
BC Khimki players
BC Krasny Oktyabr players
BC UNICS players
Basketball players from Saint Petersburg
Point guards
Russian men's basketball players
Shooting guards